Robert Antelme (5 January 1917, Sartène, Corse-du-Sud – 26 October 1990) was a French writer. During the Second World War he was involved in the French Resistance and deported.

In 1939 he married Marguerite Duras. Their child died at birth in 1942. In the same year, Duras met Dionys Mascolo, who became her lover.

Antelme was arrested and deported on 1 July 1944.  He was at Buchenwald, then Gandersheim. After the end of the war François Mitterrand found Antelme in a terrible state while visiting the Dachau concentration camp and organised his return to Paris; Mitterrand later reported that he had almost not heard Antelme's soft-voiced call to him. Marguerite Duras looked after Antelme and wrote La Douleur about his return. She divorced him soon after he regained his health, but they remained friends.

Works
Antelme later wrote  (1947) depicting his experiences in the camps. The book related his experience of detention in concentration camps. Published in 1947, the book was more than just a memoir of the hardships of a concentration camp, it was also a philosophical reflection on humanity.

Political career
Antelme was a member of the French Communist Party. His political career did not last long as he resigned from the party upon learning of the existence of labor camps in the Soviet Union.

Death
Paralyzed in 1983 by a stroke, he died on 26 October 1990 in the hospital of the Invalides in Paris.

References

Bibliography 
By Antelme
 L'espèce humaine, Gallimard 1947, 1957, 1999
 Penser la mort, Gallimard

On Robert Antelme
 Marguerite Duras, La Douleur, POL, Paris, 1985.
 Martin Crowley, Robert Antelme, l'humanité irréductible, Editions Léo Scheer, 2004

1917 births
1990 deaths
People from Corse-du-Sud
20th-century French non-fiction writers
20th-century French male writers
Buchenwald concentration camp survivors
Dachau concentration camp survivors
 French communists